The Indian Picture Opera is a magic lantern slide show by photographer Edward S. Curtis. In the early 1900s, Curtis published the renowned 20-volume book subscription entitled The North American Indian. He compiled about 2400 photographs with detailed ethnological and language studies of tribes of the American West.

In 1911, in an effort to promote his book sales, Curtis created a traveling Magic Lantern slide show, The Indian Picture Opera.

Stereo-Opticon projectors put Curtis's stunning images on screens in America's largest cities, one scene dissolving into another. A small orchestra played music derived from Indian chants and rhythms, and Edward Curtis lectured on the intimate stories of tribal life. 

This Magic Lantern show was played to breathless audiences, stunned by the humanity, fascinated by the imagery, and shamed by the destruction of Indian cultures. The shows received standing ovations, and generous reviews.

Curtis went on to produce and direct In the Land of the Head Hunters in 1914. This production was a full-length documentary motion picture of aboriginal North Americans.

In 2006, there was a contemporary remake of the Picture Opera published on DVD. Following the original script, images and music were reconstituted into a modern-day multi-media production of The Indian Picture Opera.

References

The Indian Picture Opera Pictures and words by Edward S. Curtis, newly recreated on DVD
Magic Lantern Society of the United States & Canada

Native Americans in art
Photographic collections and books
1910s in the United States
1911 works
1910s photographs